The list of shipwrecks in April 1829 includes some ships sunk, wrecked or otherwise lost during April 1829.

3 April

4 April

9 April

10 April

11 April

12 April

15 April

19 April

20 April

21 April

23 April

24 April

27 April

28 April

29 April

30 April

Unknown date

References

1829-04